Genki Rockets I: Heavenly Star is the debut studio album by Genki Rockets. The album is primarily electric in style, with Lumi's vocals displaying an omission of vibrato, which she later included into her vocals in the second album. The first 10 songs are original while 11-13 are bonus tracks which are one Japanese version of one of the original songs and two remixes.

Track listing

References
Official Website

2008 albums
2008 video albums